Steve Heim was a Republican member of the Indiana House of Representatives representing the 17th district where he has served since 2003. Heim served as the Vice Chairman of the House Committee on Environmental Affairs, and also serves on the Education Committee; Commerce, Economic Development & Small Business Committee; and the Family, Children & Human Affairs Committee. On November 7, 2006, Heim lost his reelection bid to former Democratic State Senator Nancy Dembowski.

References

External links
Steve Heim's campaign site
Steve Heim's House webpage

Living people
Republican Party members of the Indiana House of Representatives
Year of birth missing (living people)